Axel Palmgren (3 March 1867, Helsinki - 19 February 1939) was a Finnish lawyer, civil servant, business executive and politician. He served as Minister of Trade and Industry from 31 May 1924 to 31 March 1925 and again from 21 March 1931 to 14 December 1932. He was a member of the Parliament of Finland from 1917 to 1922 and again from 1924 to 1936, representing the Swedish People's Party of Finland (SFP).

References

1867 births
1939 deaths
Politicians from Helsinki
People from Uusimaa Province (Grand Duchy of Finland)
Swedish-speaking Finns
Swedish People's Party of Finland politicians
Ministers of Trade and Industry of Finland
Members of the Parliament of Finland (1917–19)
Members of the Parliament of Finland (1919–22)
Members of the Parliament of Finland (1924–27)
Members of the Parliament of Finland (1927–29)
Members of the Parliament of Finland (1929–30)
Members of the Parliament of Finland (1930–33)
Members of the Parliament of Finland (1933–36)
People of the Finnish Civil War (White side)
Businesspeople from Helsinki
University of Helsinki alumni